Tarnówka may refer to:
Tarnówka, Złotów County in Greater Poland Voivodeship (west-central Poland)
Tarnówka, Kuyavian-Pomeranian Voivodeship (north-central Poland)
Tarnówka, Łódź Voivodeship (central Poland)
Tarnówka, Masovian Voivodeship (east-central Poland)
Tarnówka, Gmina Dąbie in Greater Poland Voivodeship (west-central Poland)
Tarnówka, Gmina Grzegorzew in Greater Poland Voivodeship (west-central Poland)
Tarnówka, Gmina Kłodawa in Greater Poland Voivodeship (west-central Poland)